Séamus P. Keely (28 December 1889 – 20 March 1974) was an Irish Fianna Fáil politician. He was elected to Dáil Éireann as a Fianna Fáil Teachta Dála (TD) for the Galway constituency at the 1933 general election. He unsuccessfully contested the 1937 general election as a Fianna Fáil candidate in the Clare constituency.

References

1889 births
1974 deaths
Fianna Fáil TDs
Members of the 8th Dáil
Politicians from County Galway